George O'Brien (22 November 1935 – 18 March 2020) was a Scottish footballer who played as an inside forward.

Football career
He began his career with Blairhall Colliery before becoming a professional with Scottish Football League club Dunfermline Athletic in 1952. He spent five years with Dunfermline, scoring 25 league goals in 93 appearances. In 1957, he moved to England to play for Leeds United in the Football League. He was transferred to Southampton in 1959, having scored six times in 44 appearances during his time at Elland Road.

O'Brien spent six years at The Dell, scoring 154 league goals in 244 matches. He left Southampton in March 1966, spending a few months with Leyton Orient before moving on to  Aldershot in December 1966, where he finished his playing career.

Personal life
George died in Southampton on 18 March 2020 at the age of 84.

References

External links
Leeds United profile

1935 births
2020 deaths
Footballers from Dunfermline
Dunfermline Athletic F.C. players
Leeds United F.C. players
Southampton F.C. players
Leyton Orient F.C. players
Aldershot F.C. players
Scottish Football League players
English Football League players
Scottish footballers
Association football inside forwards
Blairhall Colliery F.C. players
Scottish Junior Football Association players